Otto Bang-Haas (20 January 1882, Dresden – 30 July 1948, Dresden) was a German entomologist and insect dealer.
His collection of microlepidoptera is in the National Museum of Denmark and of Coleoptera in the Natural History Museum of Giacomo Doria, Genoa. He followed his father Andreas Bang-Haas into the business.

References
Poggi, R. & Conci, C. 1996: [Bang-Haas, O.]  Mem. Soc. Ent. Ital. 75 13  
Riley, N. D. 1949: [Bang-Haas, O.] L'Entomologiste 82 22

External links
DEI Library
Portrait, collection details, obituary references.
NHM Database

German lepidopterists
1882 births
1948 deaths
Scientists from Dresden
19th-century German zoologists
20th-century German zoologists